The Unicode Consortium (legally Unicode, Inc.) is a 501(c)(3) non-profit organization incorporated and based in Mountain View, California. Its primary purpose is to maintain and publish the Unicode Standard which was developed with the intention of replacing existing character encoding schemes which are limited in size and scope, and are incompatible with multilingual environments. The consortium describes its overall purpose as: 

Unicode's success at unifying character sets has led to its widespread adoption in the internationalization and localization of software. The standard has been implemented in many technologies, including XML, the Java programming language, Swift, and modern operating systems.

Voting members include computer software and hardware companies with an interest in text-processing standards, including Adobe, Apple, the Bangladesh Computer Council, Emojipedia, Facebook, Google, IBM, Microsoft, the Omani Ministry of Endowments and Religious Affairs, Monotype Imaging, Netflix, Salesforce, SAP SE, Tamil Virtual Academy, and the University of California, Berkeley. Technical decisions relating to the Unicode Standard are made by the Unicode Technical Committee (UTC).

Founding 

The project to develop a universal character encoding scheme called Unicode was initiated in 1987 by Joe Becker, Lee Collins, and Mark Davis. The Unicode Consortium was incorporated in California on January 3, 1991, with the stated aim to develop, extend, and promote the use of the Unicode Standard. Mark Davis was the president of the Unicode Consortium from when the Consortium was incorporated in 1991 until 2023 when he changed roles to CTO.

Work 

The Unicode Consortium cooperates with many standards development organizations, including ISO/IEC JTC 1/SC 2 and W3C. While Unicode is often considered equivalent to ISO/IEC 10646, and the character sets are essentially identical, the Unicode standard imposes additional restrictions on implementations that ISO/IEC 10646 does not. Apart from The Unicode Standard (TUS) and its annexes (UAX), the Unicode Consortium also maintains the CLDR, collaborated with the IETF on IDNA, and publishes related standards (UTS), reports (UTR), and utilities.

The group selects the emoji icons used by the world's smartphones, based on submissions from individuals and organizations who present their case with evidence for why each one is essential.

Unicode Technical Committee 
The Unicode Technical Committee (UTC) meets quarterly to decide whether new characters will be encoded. A quorum of half of the Consortium's full members is required.

As of July 2020, there are nine full members, eight of which are tech companies: Adobe, Apple, Facebook, Google, IBM, Microsoft, Netflix, and SAP SE. The other member is the Ministry of Endowments and Religious Affairs of Oman.

The UTC accepts documents from any organization or individual, whether they are members of the Unicode Consortium or not. The UTC holds its meetings behind closed doors. As of July 2020, the UTC rules on both emoji and script proposals at the same meeting.

Due to the COVID-19 pandemic's effect on travel, the meetings, which used to be hosted on the campuses of various tech companies who would open their doors to the Consortium for free, were in 2020 held online via Zoom, although the discussions remain confidential. The UTC prefers to work by consensus, but on particularly contentious issues, votes may be necessary. After it meets, the UTC releases a public statement on each proposal it considered.

Due to the volume of incoming proposals, various subcommittees, such as the Script Ad Hoc Group and Emoji Subcommittee, exist to submit recommendations to the full UTC en banc. The UTC is under no obligation to heed these recommendations, although in practice it usually does.

Publications 

The Unicode Consortium maintains a History of Unicode Release and Publication Dates.

Publications include

See also 
 Comparison of Unicode encodings
 Universal Character Set characters
 Universal Coded Character Set

References

External links 

 

Unicode
501(c)(3) organizations
Standards organizations in the United States
Organizations based in Santa Clara County, California
Mountain View, California
Organizations established in 1991
1991 establishments in California